A eulogy (from , eulogia, Classical Greek, eu for "well" or "true", logia for "words" or "text", together for "praise") is a speech or writing in praise of a person or persons, especially one who recently died or retired, or as a term of endearment.

Eulogies may be given as part of funeral services. In the US, they take place in a funeral home during or after a wake; in the UK, they are said during the service, typically at a crematorium or place of worship, before the wake. In the US, some denominations either discourage or do not permit eulogies at services to maintain respect for traditions. Eulogies can also praise people who are still alive. This normally takes place on special occasions like birthdays, office parties, retirement celebrations, etc. Eulogies should not be confused with elegies, which are poems written in tribute to the dead; nor with obituaries, which are published biographies recounting the lives of those who have recently died; nor with obsequies, which refer generally to the rituals surrounding funerals. Roman Catholic priests are prohibited by the rubrics of the Mass from presenting a eulogy for the deceased in place of a homily during a funeral Mass.

The modern use of the word eulogy was first documented in the 16th century and came from the Medieval Latin term eulogium. Eulogium at that time has since turned into the shorter eulogy of today.

Eulogies are usually delivered by a family member or a close family friend in the case of a dead person. For a living eulogy given in such cases as a retirement, a senior colleague could perhaps deliver it. On occasions, eulogies are given to those who are severely ill or elderly in order to express words of love and gratitude before they die. Eulogies are not limited to merely people, however; places or things can also be given eulogies (which anyone can deliver), but these are less common than those delivered to people, whether living or deceased.

In some cases, a self-eulogy is written before the subject dies, with the aim of having a friend or family member read out their words to the funeral mass. Notable examples include the uplifting self-eulogy of American writer Kurt Vonnegut (borrowed from his uncle's own funeral) and a humorous self-eulogy by Australian rules footballer and media personality Lou Richards, which was read by a friend.

Famous eulogies
A successful eulogy may provide comfort, inspiration, or establish a connection to the person of whom the eulogy is in behalf. The following section will explore some well-known eulogies that have done just that.

President Ronald Reagan’s eulogy for the Challenger space shuttle crew (1986):

Charles Spencer’s eulogy for his sister, Diana, Princess of Wales (1997):

Jawaharlal Nehru’s eulogy for Mahatma Gandhi (1948):

Ted Kennedy's eulogy for his brother Robert F. Kennedy (1968):

Different types of eulogies

There are many different types of eulogies. Some of them are strictly meant to be a biography of the person's life. The short biography is simply a retelling of what the individual went through in their life. This can be done to highlight major points in the deceased's life. Another version is by telling a more personal view on what the individual did. It entails retelling memories that are shared between the storyteller and the deceased. Memories, impressions, and experiences are all things that can be included in a retelling of the personal eulogy (Burch, 2006). In most parts of the world, eulogies mostly focus on the biography of the person's life by highlighting the major events of their lives, such as work or career, education, etc.

See also

 Consolatio
 Funeral celebrant
 Funeral oration (ancient Greece)
 Obituary
 Panegyric
 Requiem
 Types of speeches

References

Acknowledgements of death
 
Laments
Non-fiction genres
Public speaking
Speeches by type